The Canadian province of Saskatchewan held municipal elections on October 25, 2006.

Mayoral Results

Corman Park No. 344
(For reeve)

Estevan

Humboldt

Lloydminster
(including portions in Alberta)

Melfort

Moose Jaw

North Battleford

Prince Albert

Regina

Mayoral race

City council
Elected councillors

Saskatoon

Mayoral race

City council
Elected councillors

Swift Current

Weyburn

Yorkton

References
Saskatoon 2006 Election Results
Regina 2006 Election Results
RM of Corman Park Results
Estevan Results
Humboldt Results
Lloydminster Results
Melfort Results
Moose Jaw Results
North Battleford Results
Prince Albert Results
Swift Current Results
Weyburn Results
Yorkton Results

Municipal elections in Saskatchewan
Saskatchewan municipal
2006 in Saskatchewan
October 2006 events in Canada